Lohorung are a major subgroup of Rai people and   ethnic native people of eastern Nepal. The Lohorung homeland is Sankhuwasabha district in the northern part of the Arun watershed, a tributary to the Koshi.
At present they are found in eight other districts of Nepal: Ilam, Jhapa, Sunsari, Morang, Dhankuta, Terhathum, Lalitpur and Kathmandu. They also live in northeastern states of India: Darjeeling,  Kalimpong & Kumai in West Bengal, Sikkim and Assam, and even Bhutan, Australia, United Kingdom and United States. 

The Lohorung language belongs to the Kiranti group of Sino-Tibetan languages.  Lohorung Yakhkhaba Yuyong is a non-profit organization advocating for the Lohorung community.  It is based in Kathmandu, Nepal.

The main festivals of Lohorung are Nwagi and Ikksammang.

Lohorung language

The different branch of Lohorung people
 Sibau
 Tingguwa
 Khaisong
 Chang-kha me
 Seppa
 Dingguwa
 Yangkhurung
 Lamsong
 Dekhim
 Biwa
 Biksik
 Lumben
 ketra
 yumpang
 Mikchereng
 Chaba
 Hanglengba

List of Lohorung villages
Yaphudanda
Khartuwa
Pangma
Heluwa
Diding
Dhupu
Tallo Dhupu
Malta
Khandbari
Ilam
Dhankuta
Letang
Angla
Dharan
Itahari
Kathmandu
Yaphu
Tumlingtar
Num
Hedangna
Dharampur, Jhapa
Sikkim, Darjeeling, Kalimpong & Kumai of India
Samtse, Chukha of Bhutan
This essay is also found in the spoken version of '''

See also
 Other Worlds: Notions of Self and Emotion among the Lohorung Rai'' a non-fiction social sciences book by Charlotte Hardman about the Lohorung people                                                                             
  Rai people Kirati Ethnolinguistic Group In Nepal & Indian State of Sikkim, Darjeeling, Kalimpong and Kumai Region of West Bengal.

References

External links
Lohorung Yakhkhaba Society
Online Lohorung language dictionary

 
Ethnic groups in Nepal
Indigenous peoples of Nepal